Stockport Etchells was a township in Cheshire, England.

Geography
Stockport Etchells covered the rural area that includes modern-day Gatley and Heald Green. Hamlets in Stockport Etchells included Gatley Green, High Grove, Long Lane, Bolshaw and Outwood.

History
Stockport Etchells existed as a township from the Middle Ages until 1894, when it was merged with the townships of Cheadle Bulkeley and Cheadle Moseley to form the Cheadle and Gatley Urban District.

Stockport Etchells and Northen Etchells were collectively called Etchells and often administered together from the 16th to 18th centuries.

References

History of Cheshire
Geography of the Metropolitan Borough of Stockport